Thomas Gladwin may refer to:

Thomas Gladwin (musician) (1710–1799), English composer and musician
Thomas Gladwin (sheriff) (1629/30–1697), Sheriff of Derbyshire